Benjamin Stone may refer to:

People 
Sir John Benjamin Stone (1838–1914), known as Benjamin Stone, English politician and photographer
Benjamin Stone (actor) (born 1987), British actor
Benjamin Clemens Stone (1933–1994), British–American botanist
Ben Stone (politician) (born 1935), American politician

In fiction 
Benjamin Stone (Law & Order), a character in the television series Law & Order, played by Michael Moriarty
Dr. Benjamin Stone, a character in the film Doc Hollywood, played by Michael J. Fox
Benjamin Stone, a character in the film Knocked Up, played by Seth Rogen
Benjamin Stone, a character in the television series Manifest, played by Josh Dallas